Silver River may refer to:

Streams 
Canada
 Big Silver Creek, also known as the Big Silver River or Silver River, entering Harrison Lake, British Columbia, Canada, and also a locality of the same name at its mouth:
 Silver River, British Columbia

Grenada
Silver River (Grenada)

Ireland
 Silver River (Ireland), in central Ireland

United States
 Silver River (Florida), in central Florida, USA
 Silver River (Keweenaw County), Michigan, drains to Lake Superior
 Silver River (Baraga County), Michigan, drains to Huron Bay on Lake Superior
 Silver River (Baraga–Houghton counties), Michigan, drains to the Sturgeon River

Other uses 
 Silver River (film), a 1948 film starring Errol Flynn, with Ann Sheridan and Thomas Mitchell
 The Silver River, a 1997 chamber opera by Bright Sheng
 Silver River, a name of the Milky Way in East Asian languages
 "Silver River", a song by Gotthard from the 2017 album Silver

See also 
 Silver River in Spanish: Río de la Plata, a river of South America
 Silver River State Park, the former name of Silver Springs State Park in Florida